Izlake is a settlement in the Municipality of Zagorje ob Savi in the Central Sava Valley, central Slovenia. The area is part of the traditional region of Upper Carniola. It is now included with the rest of the municipality in the Central Sava Statistical Region.

Tourism
Izlake is best known for the currently (as of July 2010) defunct Medijske Toplice thermal baths and has been the tourism centre of the region. Other attractions include mostly outdoor activities such as hiking to surrounding peaks as well as some cultural heritage sights, most notably Medija Castle, where the renowned Slovene polymath Johann Weikhard von Valvasor spent his childhood and is most likely buried in the family tomb.

The parish church in the settlement is dedicated to Saint George and belongs to the Roman Catholic Archdiocese of Ljubljana. It dates to the 16th century.

Notable people
Notable people that were born or lived in Izlake include:
Janez Drnovšek (1950–2008), liberal politician, President of the Presidency of Yugoslavia, Prime Minister of Slovenia and President of Slovenia
Alojz Prašnikar (1821–1889), industrialist
Benigen Snoj (1867–1942), born Franc Snoj, priest and founder of the Parish of St. Cyril in New York
Johann Weikhard von Valvasor (1641–1693), natural historian and a fellow of the Royal Society in London

References

External links
 Izlake on Geopedia

Populated places in the Municipality of Zagorje ob Savi
Spa towns in Slovenia